The Republican Party is a political party in Malawi. It was founded by Stanley Masauli and Gwanda Chakuamba in 2004.
At the general election of 20 May 2004 its candidate for president (Gwanda Chakuamba) won 25.7% of the vote, and the party was part of the Mgwirizano Coalition, which won 27 out of 194 seats.

See also
New Republican Party

References

Political parties in Malawi
2004 establishments in Malawi
Political parties established in 2004